General Barry may refer to:

Jim Barry (general) (born 1932), Australian Army Reserve major general
John D. Barry (1839–1867), Confederate States Army brigadier general (temporary appointment)
Thomas Henry Barry (1855–1919), U.S. Army major general
Tom Barry (Irish republican) (1897–1980), Irish Republican Army lieutenant general
William Farquhar Barry (1818–1879), U.S. Army brevet major general

See also
Beekman Du Barry (1828–1901), U.S. Army brigadier general
Attorney General Barry (disambiguation)